George Henry Chase (June 13, 1874 – February 2, 1952) was a U.S. archaeologist and educator.  From 1916 through 1945 he was the first John E. Hudson Professor of Archaeology at Harvard University.

Chase was the principal excavator at the Argive Heraeum.

He graduated from Harvard University.

References 

 https://www.jstor.org/stable/496668?seq=1#page_scan_tab_contents

1874 births
1952 deaths
American archaeologists
Harvard University faculty
Harvard University alumni